The Bossi were a renowned firm of Italian organ builders originally from Mendrisio (Canton Ticino).

Bossi family tree

Footnotes

Further reading

External links

 Bergamo e provincia, terra di Organi

Italian pipe organ builders
Musical instrument manufacturing companies of Italy